Vinnie Ha Ha is an unincorporated community located in the town of Koshkonong, Jefferson County, Wisconsin, United States.

Notes

Unincorporated communities in Jefferson County, Wisconsin
Unincorporated communities in Wisconsin